Sparre (variously spelled Sperra, Sper, Spar) is a Scandinavian surname - originally borne by a noble family - and can refer to:

 Aage Jepsen Sparre, Danish priest
 Arvid Gustavsson Sparre (1245 - 1317), Lord of Ekholmen, Sweden
 Axel Sparre (1652 - 1728), Swedish field marshal 
 Beata Sparre, Swedish courtier
 Christian Sparre, Norwegian politician
 Desirée Sparre-Enger, Norwegian pop singer
 Gustaf Adolf Sparre, Swedish art collector
 Gustaf Adolf Vive Sparre, Prime Minister for Justice of Sweden from 1848 to 1856
 Gustaf Sparre (speaker), Speaker of the Första kammaren 1896–1908
 Malise Sparre (d. 1389), claimant to the Earldom of Orkney

Various governors of Swedish counties:

 Axel Sparre, Over-Governor of Stockholm from 1665 to 1673
 Axel Wrede Sparre, Over-Governor of Stockholm from 1770 to 1772
 Carl Georg Sparre, Governor of Norrbotten County from 1825 to 1836
 Carl Gustaf Sparre, Governor of Södermanland County from 1737 to 1739
 Carl Larsson Sparre, Governor of Västernorrland County from 1664 to 1677
 Carl Sparre, Governor of Gävleborg County from 1763 and 1772 and Over-Governor of Stockholm from 1773 to 1791
 Erik Carlsson Sparre, Governor of Södermanland County from 1657 to 1678
 Erik Samuel Sparre, Governor of Gävleborg County from 1813 to 1843
 Fredrik Henrik Sparre, Governor of Gävleborg County from 1762 to 1763
 Göran Bengtsson Sparre af Rossvik, Governor of Södermanland County from 1653 to 1657
 Knut Sparre, Governor of Jämtland County from 1895 to 1906
 Svante Larsson Sparre, Governor of Stockholm County and Uppsala County from 1649 to 1651

See also 
Sparr (disambiguation)

Danish-language surnames
Norwegian-language surnames
Swedish-language surnames